James A. Johnson may refer to:

James A. Johnson (California politician) (1829–1896), American politician and Californian Lieutenant Governor
James A. Johnson (architect) (1865–1939), American architect
James Allen Johnson (1924–2016), United States Army major general
James A. Johnson (businessman) (1943–2020), American businessman and Democratic Party political figure
James Austin Johnson (born 1989), American comedian & actor, Saturday Night Live cast member

See also
James A. C. Johnson (1867–1937), mayor of Englewood, New Jersey
James Johnson (disambiguation)